The Aeromarine AM-1 was a biplane built to pursue a US Air Mail Service requirement for a nighttime transport.

Design and development
The AM-1 was completed 122 days from the announcement of a 1924 requirement for a nighttime mail plane capable of hauling  of mail. The contest was lost to Douglas aircraft.

The engine was fully cowled with the exhaust stacks stretching behind the pilot. The water-cooled engine used a centrally mounted radiator mounted above the top wing for visibility. Two streamlined fuel tanks sat on top of the wings. The upper wing was larger than the lower wing, each using spruce spars. The tail surfaces were aluminum framed with fabric covering. Many components were common with the design of the Aeromarine AMC flying boat.

Variants
Aeromarine AM-1
Base version
Aeromarine AM-2
A slight redesign to address nose drop with engine out, and drag. The aircraft was the same as an AM-1 except the radiator was relocated under the fuselage.
Aeromarine AM-3
Radiator moved to the front of the engine, tested with 350hp engine, found to be under-performing.

Specifications (Aeromarine AM-1)

See also

References

Single-engined tractor aircraft
Biplanes
AM-1
1920s United States cargo aircraft
Aircraft first flown in 1923